Laurie Lamon (born 1956) is an American poet.

Education
Lamon earned her bachelor's degree from Whitworth College (now Whitworth University) in Spokane, Washington, her master's in fine arts from the University of Montana, and her doctorate in English literature from the University of Utah in 1988.

Career
Lamon is an associate professor of English at Whitworth University and teaches courses that include poetry workshop, creative writing, and contemporary American poetry.

Her poems have appeared in The New Republic, Ploughshares, The New Criterion, The Colorado Review, The Atlantic Monthly, Arts & Letters Journal of Contemporary Culture, Feminist Studies, Primavera, Poetry Northwest, and Northwest Review.

Awards
 2001 Pushcart Prize for the poem, Pain Thinks of the Beautiful Table
 2002 Graves Award in the Humanities.
 2007 Witter Bynner Fellow, named by U.S. poet laureate Donald Hall

Works

Anthologies

Ploughshares

References

External links
 http://www.whitworth.edu/Academic/Department/English/Faculty/LamonLaurie/Index.htm
 https://web.archive.org/web/20070927234948/http://www.whitworth.edu/News/2004_2005/Spring/LamonForkHunger.htm
 http://www.pshares.org/authors/authorDetails.cfm?prmAuthorID=6592
https://www.loc.gov/poetry/bynner.html
http://www.laurielamon.com/default.aspx

1956 births
Living people
Whitworth University faculty
Whitworth University alumni
University of Montana alumni
University of Utah alumni
American women poets
20th-century American poets
20th-century American women writers
American women academics
21st-century American women